Arabuli is a Georgian surname. Notable people with the surname include:
Bachana Arabuli (born 1994), Georgian footballer
Levan Arabuli (born 1992), Georgian Greco-Roman wrestler

Surnames of Georgian origin
Georgian-language surnames